Same-sex marriage in West Virginia has been legally recognized since October 9, 2014. On July 28, 2014, a ruling by the Fourth Circuit Court of Appeals in Bostic v. Schaefer found Virginia's ban on same-sex marriage unconstitutional. On October 6, 2014, the U.S. Supreme Court denied certiorari in Bostic, allowing the ruling to take effect. As a result, on October 9, 2014, Governor Earl Ray Tomblin announced he was ordering state agencies to act in compliance with the controlling precedent in the Virginia case. Even though West Virginia's ban was not explicitly declared unconstitutional, the Fourth Circuit precedent made it certain the state's statutory ban would be overturned. The state started issuing marriage licenses to same-sex couples that same day. The U.S. District Court for the Southern District of West Virginia officially ruled the state's same-sex marriage ban unconstitutional on November 7, 2014.

Legal history

Background
State statutes define marriage as between "a man and a woman". In 2009, a bill that would have amended the State Constitution to ban same-sex marriage was voted down 67–30 by the House of Delegates. All 29 House Republicans voted to move the measure out of committee, along with one Democrat. The amendment was heavily supported by Evangelical groups in the state and the Family Council Policy of West Virginia. In 2010, The Marriage Protection Amendment was re-introduced in both the House of Delegates and the Senate. Republican efforts to discharge the measure from the House Constitutional Revision Committee were defeated by 68 votes to 30. The amendment was later defeated in the Senate.

In December 2011, Delegate John Doyle introduced a bill to legalize civil unions in West Virginia as one of his last acts before retirement in 2012. It was submitted to the House of Delegates in February 2012 and died without a vote.

West Virginia has extended hospital visitation rights to same-sex couples through a designated visitor statute.

McGee v. Cole 
On October 1, 2013, Lambda Legal filed a lawsuit, McGee v. Cole, in the U.S. District Court for the Southern District of West Virginia on behalf of three same-sex couples and one of their children, challenging the state's denial of marriage licenses to same-sex couples. The suit named two county clerks as defendants. On November 21, Attorney General Patrick Morrisey asked the court to allow his office to defend the state's statutes, and on December 19 both he and the clerks asked the court to dismiss part of the suit. On January 30, 2014, the judge assigned to the case, U.S. District Judge Robert C. Chambers, dismissed the part of the suit challenging the state's refusal to recognize same-sex marriages from other jurisdictions, since none of the plaintiffs had married elsewhere, but he invited the plaintiffs to add plaintiffs that had done so and the plaintiffs said they were considering that.

On June 10, 2014, Judge Chambers ordered a stay of proceedings until a ruling in Bostic v. Schaefer, a case in the Fourth Circuit Court of Appeals that challenged Virginia's denial of marriage rights to same-sex couples. The district judge reasoned that "because of the overlap in the issues present" the Virginia case should be decided first. His order paralleled those in two other same-sex marriage cases in the Fourth Circuit's jurisdiction: Harris v. Rainey, another Virginia case, and Bradacs v. Haley, a South Carolina case. Following a decision in favor of same-sex marriage rights in Bostic on July 28, the parties in McGee filed competing motions with the district court on whether to allow the case to proceed. Judge Chambers on September 16 extended the stay pending action by the U.S. Supreme Court. He gave the defendants until October 21 to respond to a motion to rule in the plaintiffs' favor. On October 6, 2014, the U.S. Supreme Court refused to hear the appeal of the ruling from the Fourth Circuit, and the plaintiffs asked the court to rule for them.

Attorney General Morrisey announced on October 9 that he would no longer defend the suit since the U.S. Supreme Court had declined to review Bostic, which had found Virginia's denial of marriage rights to same-sex couples unconstitutional. On October 9, 2014, Governor Earl Ray Tomblin announced he was ordering state agencies to act in compliance with the recent decisions of federal courts on the unconstitutionality of same-sex marriage bans. The state started issuing marriage licenses to same-sex couples that same day. Among the first couples to marry were Casie McGee and Sarah Adkins, plaintiffs in McGee, who filed marriage paperwork in Huntington on October 9, and had a marriage ceremony on the steps of the Cabell County Courthouse shortly after. Chris Bostic and David Epp were the first couple to receive a marriage license in Charleston.

Judge Chambers ruled on November 7 that the state's denial of marriage rights to same-sex couples was unconstitutional. In July 2015, Judge Chambers ordered the state to pay $92,000 to the plaintiff couples in attorneys' fees.

Demographics and marriage statistics
Data from the 2000 U.S. census showed that 2,916 same-sex couples were living in West Virginia. By 2005, this had increased to 3,423 couples, likely attributed to same-sex couples' growing willingness to disclose their partnerships on government surveys. Same-sex couples lived in all counties of the state, and constituted 0.7% of coupled households and 0.4% of all households in the state. Most couples lived in Kanawha, Cabell and Berkeley counties, but the counties with the highest percentage of same-sex couples were Jefferson (0.74% of all county households) and Morgan (0.62%). Same-sex partners in West Virginia were on average younger than opposite-sex partners, and more likely to be employed. In addition, the average and median household incomes of same-sex couples were higher than different-sex couples, but same-sex couples were far less likely to own a home than opposite-sex partners. 14% of same-sex couples in West Virginia were raising children under the age of 18, with an estimated 713 children living in households headed by same-sex couples in 2005.

310 and 490 same-sex marriages were performed in West Virginia in 2014 and 2015, respectively, with most performed in Cabell County at 155, followed by Kanawha County at 107, Wood County at 61, Monongalia County at 51, Ohio County at 47, and Harrison County at 40. Same-sex marriages represented about 4% of all marriages conducted in 2015.

Public opinion
According to the Public Religion Research Institute (PRRI), 45% and 37% of West Virginia residents supported same-sex marriage in 2015 and 2016, respectively. In the 2016 poll, West Virginia was one of the only three U.S. states where a majority of residents were opposed to same-sex marriage; the others being Arkansas and Mississippi.

In 2017, a PRRI poll showed that 48% of West Virginia respondents supported same-sex marriage, 45% were opposed and 7% were unsure. A PRRI survey conducted between March 8 and November 9, 2021 showed that 56% of West Virginia respondents supported same-sex marriage, while 44% opposed.

See also
 Politics of West Virginia
 LGBT rights in West Virginia
 Same-sex marriage in the United States

References

LGBT in West Virginia
Politics of West Virginia
West Virginia law
2014 in LGBT history
West Virginia
2014 in West Virginia